Rosina Harrison (1899-1989 aged 90) was a lady-in-waiting, chiefly to Lady Astor, and became known after describing their working relationship in her autobiography.

Harrison, from Yorkshire, became Astor's maid in 1928.

Her autobiography, Rose: My Life in Service, was published in 1975. It was republished in 2011 under the title The Lady's Maid: My Life in Service.

She appeared as a castaway on the BBC Radio programme Desert Island Discs on 20 March 1976.

Biography
  her occupation was being the lady's maid. she called her parents mum and dad. her major accomplishment was working for Lady Astor. she died at age 90.

References

1899 births
Place of birth missing
1989 deaths
Place of death missing